Vapi Busbakara (25 June 1891 – 15 December 1982) was the Princess of Siam (later Thailand). She was a member of Siamese Royal Family. She was a daughter of King Chulalongkorn (Rama V). She was one of the longest-living personages in Thai history, behind three children of King Mongkut (Rama IV); Princess Nabhabhorn Prabha, who died at the age of 94 in 1958, Princess Praditha Sari, who died in 1962 at the age of 96, and Prince Krida Bhinihan, who died at the age of 97 in 1952.

Her mother was Chao Chom Manda Phrom (daughter of Phraya Phitsanuloka Thibodi), but her mother died while she was very young. Later, Queen Savang Vadhana took her in as her adopted daughter, along with her elder sister, Princess Prabha Bannabilaya, including also her full siblings Princess Yaovabha Bongsanid, and Prince Rangsit Prayurasakdi.

She had 3 full siblings; 2 elder sisters, and 1 elder brother;
 Princess Prabha Bannabilaya (13 August 1885 – 8 September 1948)
 Princess Prabai Bannapilas (13 August 1885 – 17 September 1886) Princess Prabha Bannabilaya's twin sister.
 Prince Samaya Vudhirodom (13 September 1888 – 9 December 1889)

Princess Vapi Busbakara was the only adopted daughter of Queen Sri Savarindira, who managed and took care of her stepmother's body at death, before traditional Buddhist Royal Cremation was observed. She died on 15 December 1982, at the age of 90. Royal crematorium was done on 26 March 1983, by King Bhumibol Adulyadej.

Royal Decorations
  Dame of The Most Illustrious Order of the Royal House of Chakri: received 9 May 1950
  Dame Cross of the Most Illustrious Order of Chula Chom Klao (First class): received 2 May 1950
  Dame Grand Cordon of the Most Exalted Order of the White Elephant
  Dame Grand Cordon of the Most Noble Order of the Crown of Thailand
  Dame Cross of the Vallabhabhorn Order
  King Rama V's Royal Cypher Medal (Second Class)
  King Rama VI's Royal Cypher Medal (Second Class)
  King Rama VII's Royal Cypher Medal (First Class)
  King Rama VIII's Royal Cypher Medal (First Class)
  King Rama IX's Royal Cypher Medal (First Class)

Ancestry

Busbakara, Vapi
Busbakara, Vapi
19th-century Thai women
19th-century Chakri dynasty
20th-century Thai women
20th-century Chakri dynasty
Thai female Phra Ong Chao
Dames Grand Cross of the Order of Chula Chom Klao
Members of the Vallabhabhorn Order
Children of Chulalongkorn
Daughters of kings